Lionel James "L-Train" Simmons (born November 14, 1968) is an American former professional basketball player.

High school career
Simmons led South Philadelphia High School to a Philadelphia Public League boys' championship in 1986, getting an MVP award in the process. He was inducted into the Philadelphia Sports Hall of Fame in 2008.

College career
Simmons was a 6'7" small forward from La Salle University, where he won the Naismith College Player of the Year and John R. Wooden Award as a senior. Simmons is fourth in all-time NCAA career points with 3,217 and trails only Pete Maravich, Freeman Williams and Chris Clemons. Simmons became the first player in NCAA history to score more than 3,000 points and pull down more than 1,100 rebounds. He holds the NCAA Basketball record for most consecutive games scoring in double figures with 115. He led the Explorers to three straight NCAA Tournament appearances (1988–90). Simmons was Player of the Year in the Metro Atlantic Athletic Conference for three years. He was a four-time First Team All Big 5 selection and won the Robert V. Geasey Trophy as Big 5 MVP three times. During his career, the Explorers had a 100-31 record. Simmons was inducted into the La Salle University Hall of Athletes in 1995. Simmons was inducted into the Big 5 Hall of Fame in 1996.

College statistics
Source

|-
| align="left" | 1986–87
| align="left" | La Salle
| 33 || 33 || 38.0 || .526 || .333 || .763 || 9.8 || 1.8 || 1.6 || 1.4 || 20.3
|-
| align="left" | 1987–88
| align="left" | La Salle
| 34 || 34 || 39.0 || .485 || .250 || .757 || 11.4 || 2.5 || 2.1 || 2.3 || 23.3
|-
| align="left" | 1988–89
| align="left" | La Salle
| 32 || 32 || 38.9 || .487 || .375 || .711 || 11.4 || 3.0 || 1.7 || 1.9 || 28.4
|-
| align="left" | 1989–90
| align="left" | La Salle
| 32 || 32 || 38.1 || .513 || .477 || .661 || 11.1 || 3.6 || 1.9 || 2.0 || 26.5
|-
| align="left" | Career
| align="left" |
| 131 || 131 || 38.5 || .501 || .415 || .722 || 10.9 || 2.7 || 1.8 || 1.9 || 24.6
|-

Professional career
Simmons was selected by the Sacramento Kings with the seventh pick of the 1990 NBA draft. On March 23, 1991, Simmons scored a career-high 42 points in a 95-100 loss to the Phoenix Suns. He was the runner-up to Derrick Coleman for the 1991 NBA Rookie of the Year Award. Simmons was NBA Player of the Week the week after the All-Star break during his rookie season.

He played seven seasons for the Kings, scoring 5,833 career points until prematurely retiring in 1997 due to chronic injuries. He managed to earn more than $21 million in an NBA career that lasted seven seasons.

See also
List of NCAA Division I men's basketball players with 2,000 points and 1,000 rebounds
List of NCAA Division I men's basketball career scoring leaders

References

External links
Career Stats

1968 births
Living people
African-American basketball players
All-American college men's basketball players
American men's basketball players
Basketball players from Philadelphia
La Salle Explorers men's basketball players
Sacramento Kings draft picks
Sacramento Kings players
Small forwards
United States men's national basketball team players
21st-century African-American people
20th-century African-American sportspeople
South Philadelphia High School alumni